Air Commodore Paavo Elwin-Paul Kamanya is a Namibian military officer who is serving as Defence Attache to Sri Lanka. He previously served as deputy Namibian Air Force commander.

Military career

Kamanya is a veteran of the national liberation movement under SWAPO. He joined the Namibian Defence Force (NDF) and is a pioneer of the NDF Air Wing. During Namibia's deployment to the Democratic Republic of the Congo he also participated in the Second Congo War, flying resupply missions, including resupply to besieged Namibian and Zimbabwean troops at Ikela. During one of the flights a technician was mortally  wounded. Instead of turning back he proceeded with the flight to Ikela. For his actions president Sam Nujoma awarded him the Most Distinguished Order of Namibia.

He was appointed as the VR1 Squadron commanding officer, later he served as commanding officer stationed at Grootfontein Air Force Base. In the 2010s he was promoted to Colonel and made deputy Air Force commander. In January 2016 he was posted to India as Defence Attache and was replaced by Air Commodore Teofilus Shaende as deputy Air Force Commander. Later he was transferred to Sri Lanka as Defence Attache.

Honours and decorations
 Most Distinguished Order of Namibia
  DRC Campaign Medal
  DRC Campaign Medal
  NDF Commendation Medal
  Twenty Years Service Medal

References

Living people
Namibian military personnel
Namibian Air Force air marshals
1960 births